K2 Integrity (formerly K2 Intelligence) is a risk, compliance, investigations, regulatory monitoring, financial crimes risk and compliance, and advisory services firm.  Founded in 2009 by Jeremy M. Kroll and Jules B. Kroll, the company is headquartered in New York City with international offices in London, England, Washington, D.C., Madrid, Spain, Geneva, Switzerland, Los Angeles, California, and Chicago, Illinois. In November 2020, K2 Intelligence rebranded to K2 Integrity.

Clients and industries served include financial institutions, law firms, hedge fund firms, private equity firms, governmental agencies, and private and sovereign clients.

As of 2020, the company employs a workforce of about 350 employees.

History
Jules Kroll and his son, Jeremy Kroll, opened K2 Intelligence’s first office in London in 2009. Shortly after, the company’s headquarters moved to a New York City location in January 2010. By April, a second office opened in Madrid.
In early 2013, K2 Intelligence had a workforce of 120 employees.
K2 Intelligence’s European presence continued to expand when K2G Global Limited in Tel Aviv, Israel, was established as part of its Cyber Investigations and Defense Practice.

Acquisitions
In December 2012, K2 Intelligence acquired Thacher Associates, which oversaw the cleanup of the World Trade Center site, the building of the new Yankee Stadium, and construction of the Bank of America Tower in Manhattan.

Notable Investigations
During a 2013 public corruption case, the Moreland Commission hired K2 Integrity “to search databases for donations linked to the passage of legislation or the awarding of state contracts.”
In 2014, K2 Integrity provided data analytics litigation support to maximize the recovery of funds to be distributed to the victims of the Bernie Madoff Ponzi scheme (Madoff Investment Scandal).
In 2018, a forensic investigation was completed on behalf of the International Boxing Association (AIBA) that documented gross negligence and financial mismanagement of AIBA affairs and finances.
K2 Integrity investigated an international scam artist known as the Con Queen of Hollywood targeting and impersonating prominent high-profile entertainment industry figures since 2018. The elusive thief lured insiders with promises of work and swindled thousands of dollars from victims all over the world. The multi-year investigation led to the arrest of the suspect in Manchester, England on November 26, 2020.

References

External links 

 

2009 establishments in New York (state)
American companies established in 2009
Cyberwarfare in the United States